Paul Anthony Tipton (born 26 May 1954) is an English dentist and former cricketer.

Tipton was born at Manchester in 1954. After playing second XI cricket for Lancashire from 1971 to 1978, he debuted in minor counties cricket for Cheshire against Durham in the 1980 Minor Counties Championship. He played minor counties cricket for Cheshire until 1983, making 24 appearances in the Minor Counties Championship and four appearances in the MCCA Knockout Trophy. In addition to playing minor counties cricket for Cheshire, Tipton also appeared in two List A one-day matches for the county, playing against first-class opponents in the form of Middlesex in the 1982 NatWest Trophy, and Kent in the 1983 NatWest Trophy.

References

External links

1954 births
Living people
English cricketers
Cheshire cricketers
Cricketers from Manchester